This is a list of nature centers and environmental education centers in the state of Delaware. 

To use the sortable tables: click on the icons at the top of each column to sort that column in alphabetical order; click again for reverse alphabetical order.

Resources
 EcoDelaware
 Delaware Association for Environmental Education

External links
 Google Map of nature centers and environmental education centers in Delaware

 
Nature center
Delaware